Massilia alkalitolerans is a Gram-negative, rod-shaped, non-spore-forming bacterium from the genus Massilia and the family  Oxalobacteraceae.

References

External links
Type strain of Massilia alkalitolerans at BacDive -  the Bacterial Diversity Metadatabase

Burkholderiales
Bacteria described in 2011